Oumar Basakoulba Kone is a paralympic athlete from Côte d'Ivoire. He has competed in category T46 (limb deficiency, having had his right hand amputated), mainly in the 400m and 800m events.

Oumar has competed at a total of four Paralympics, starting in 1996 where he won gold in both the 800m (setting a world record, at 1 minute 55.45 secs) and 400m (in 50.23 seconds) as well as competing in the 1500m. 

He repeated these events at the 2000 Summer Paralympics in Sydney, earning gold in the 800m.  In his next two games in 1996 and 2008, he competed in just the 400m and 800m but was unable to add any further medals.

References

External links
Oumar Kone, athlète paralympique (Video, Daily Motion, 2012)

Paralympic athletes of Ivory Coast
Athletes (track and field) at the 1996 Summer Paralympics
Athletes (track and field) at the 2000 Summer Paralympics
Athletes (track and field) at the 2004 Summer Paralympics
Athletes (track and field) at the 2008 Summer Paralympics
Paralympic gold medalists for Ivory Coast
Ivorian male sprinters
Ivorian male middle-distance runners
Living people
Year of birth missing (living people)
Medalists at the 1996 Summer Paralympics
Medalists at the 2000 Summer Paralympics
Paralympic medalists in athletics (track and field)